Tula's Institute is a private and self-financing engineering and management college set up by the Rishabh Educational Trust in 2006. It is at Dehradun in Uttarakhand. . It is an ISO 9001:2008 certified institute.

History

Tula’s Institute was founded in 2006 by the Sunil Kumar Jain, the chairman of Tula’s .

Programmes

Tula’s Institute offers 12 academic programmes as B.Tech, M.Tech, MBA, BBA, MCA ,BCA, Diploma, BSC(Agriculture), B.Com(Hons) and BJMC . The college offers 912 seats as the annual intake in all programmes.

B.Tech, four years

 Computer Science & Engineering - 180 seats
 Electronics & Communication Engineering - 30 seats
 Electrical & Electronics Engineering - 30 seats
 Mechanical Engineering  - 60 seats
 Civil Engineering - 60 seats

M.Tech, two years

 Computer Science & Engineering
 Thermal Engineering
 Structural Engineering

BBA, three years

BCA, three years

MBA, two years

MCA, two years

BSC, four years

 Agriculture - 120 seats

Diploma, three years

 Electrical & Electronics Engineering
 Mechanical Engineering

Admission course. 
10+2 with passing marks.

Campus

The Tula's Institute is sited on the Dehradun – Chakrata Road (NH-72) in Dhoolkot at Town Selaqui in District Dehradun, Uttarakhand. The campus is 16 km from the Dehradun Railway Station and 43 km from the Jolly Grant Airport, Dehradun.

Facilities

Tula's Institute has four hostels for boys and two hostels for girls. Students may serve themselves at the cafeteria.

It has a library with three sections: one is a digital library, second is NPTEL library and another one is a reference library. It has a central air-conditioned auditorium. It has established a "Microsoft Innovation Centre". It provides the "D-Link Academic Campus Connect Programme".

Activities

Tula's Institute conducts clubs, committees, guest lectures and NCC programmes. It organizes the annual festival "Sanskriti", technical festival named "Utkrisht", workshops, and extracurricular activities.

External links
 .

References

Engineering colleges in Uttarakhand
Universities and colleges in Dehradun
Educational institutions established in 2006
2006 establishments in Uttarakhand